Procidis is a French animation studio, founded by Albert Barillé, which among other things produced the educational series Once Upon a Time... (Man 1978, Space 1982, Life 1987, The Americas 1992, The Discoverers 1994, The Explorers 1997, Music 2007, and Planet Earth 2008). Its programs are sold in more than 100 countries. The last series launched that was translated into English was "Les Zooriginaux" (Wild Instinct), which was released in 2001 in France, Belgium, Germany, Italy, and the United Kingdom. The Music (Spanish) and Planet Earth (French) series have not yet been translated into English.

References

External links
 Official website

French companies established in 1978
Once Upon a Time...
French animation studios